The Ethiopian Christmas (Amharic: ገና; Genna) is celebrated by the Ethiopian Orthodox, Eritrean Orthodox as well as the Protestant and Catholic denomination in Ethiopia on 7 January (Tahsas 29 in the Ethiopian calendar). A distinct feature of Ethiopian Christmas is the traditional hockey game long associated with the holiday. It is believed that shepherds tending their flocks on the night Jesus was born.

Christians should fast 43 days, a period known as Tsome Nebiyat or the Fast of the Prophets. They must abstain from dairy products and alcoholic drinks. People wear netela cloth and attend church services at night. In Lalibela, pilgrimages are made to its renowned churches.

Overview
The Ethiopian Christmas, also called Genna, is celebrated on 7 January (Tahsas 29 in the Ethiopian calendar) as the day of Jesus' birth, alongside the Russian, Greek, Eritrean and Serbian Orthodox Churches. It also celebrated by Protestant and Catholic denominations in the country. One of the district features of Ethiopian Christmas is the traditional game similar to hockey. The game is believed to have evolved from the shepherds tending their flocks on the night Jesus was born. 

Ethiopian Orthodox Christians should fast for 43 days, which also known as Tsome Nebiyat or the Fast of the Prophets. Fasting also includes abstaining from all non-non-egat products and psychoactive substances, including alcohol and meat. Since 25 November, the fast believed to be "cleansing the body of sin" in front of Jesus Christ.

Festivities
In Christmas, a thin white cotton garment called netela is worn. On the eve of Christmas, Ethiopian Christians attend an overnight church service, usually starting around 6 pm and finishing at 3 am. People lineup surrounding a church and begin a long, looping procession around the circumference of the church. The festivities are a communal experience and a commitment of faith. The holiday attracts pilgrimages to the renowned Lalibela Churches.

References

Public holidays in Ethiopia
Christmas traditions